Sesbania grandiflora, commonly known as vegetable hummingbird, katurai, agati, or West Indian pea, is a small leguminous tree native to Maritime Southeast Asia and Northern Australia. It has edible flowers and leaves commonly eaten in Southeast Asia and South Asia.

Description
Sesbania grandiflora is a fast-growing tree. The leaves are regular and rounded and the flowers white, red or pink. The fruits look like flat, long, thin green beans. The tree thrives under full exposure to sunshine and is extremely frost sensitive.

The calyx is campanulate and shallowly two-lipped.

Origin and distribution
It is native to Maritime Southeast Asia (Malaysia, Indonesia, Philippines, Brunei) to Northern Australia, and is cultivated in many parts of South India and Sri Lanka. It has many traditional uses.
It grows where there is good soil and a hot, humid climate.

Culinary uses
The flowers of S. grandiflora are eaten as a vegetable in Southeast Asia and South Asia, including Java and Lombok in Indonesia, the Ilocos Region of the Philippines, Vietnam, Laos, and Thailand.

In Khmer language, the flowers are called ផ្កាអង្គាដី (angkea dei) and young leaves and flowers are used in the cuisine both cooked in curries, such as Samlor mchou angkea dei and salad sauce bok amproek or toek kroeung. 

In the Thai language, the flowers are called ดอกแค (dok khae) and are used in the cuisine both cooked in curries, such as kaeng som and kaeng khae, and raw or blanched with nam phrik.

In India, this plant is known as அகத்தி (Tamil), hadga (हादगा in Marathi), agasti (Odia), agasey (Kannada), అవిసె (Telugu), and both the leaves and the flowers have culinary uses.  It is known as Bok phool (বকফুল) in West Bengal and Assam, India and Bangladesh, and is eaten after being fried with gram paste.

The young pods are also eaten. In Sri Lanka, agati leaves, known as Katuru murunga in Sinhala language, are sometimes added to sudhu hodhi or white curry, a widely eaten, thin coconut gravy. It is also eaten in the Maldives (locally known as Feeru Muran'ga, ފީރު މުރަނގަ).

See also
Sesbania bispinosa
Dolichandrone spathacea, known as Dok khae thale in Thai 
Markhamia stipulata, known as Dok khae hua mu in Thai 
Edible flowers
List of Thai ingredients

References

External links

 Sesbania grandiflora on Tropicalforages.info
Sesbania grandiflora in the AgroForestry Database of the World Agroforestry Centre
 Sesbania grandiflora on the FAO web site
 Sesbania grandiflora on the web site of the Center for New Crops & Plant Products at Purdue University.
 " Sesbania Seeds Exporter Kohenoor International Pakistan" 

Faboideae
Trees of Malesia
Trees of Australia
Inflorescence vegetables
Garden plants of Asia
Nitrogen-fixing crops
Ornamental trees